Lake Sherwood is a man-made lake located near the city limits, southwest of Topeka, Kansas, United States. The name is also used for the surrounding community.

External links
 Sherwood Lake Club.org

Lakes of Kansas
Lakes of Shawnee County, Kansas